Abdulrazak Yusuf (born 10 January 2000) is a Nigerian professional footballer.

References

External links 
 
 Player's profile at pressball.by

2000 births
Living people
Nigerian footballers
Nigerian expatriate footballers
Expatriate footballers in Belarus
Nigerian expatriate sportspeople in Belarus
Association football midfielders
FC Isloch Minsk Raion players
Sportspeople from Jos